Mobile Money is a mobile payments system based on accounts held by a mobile operator and accessible from subscribers’ mobile phones. The conversion of cash into electronic value (and vice versa) happens at retail stores (or agents). All transactions are authorised and recorded in real-time using SMS.

In 2008, a Ugandan software developer named Ronald Egesa of Mobitrix Uganda Ltd was reported by the leading newspapers to have developed the country's first mobile phone bank that he called SmartCash  It was reported to be a network independent service.

In 2009, GSMA made a grant to Safaricom to support the development of a social transfer payment project via M-Pesa.

M-PESA was developed by Vodafone and first deployed by its Kenyan affiliate Safaricom. In May 2012, there were over 15 million customers of M-PESA in Kenya.

Countries with a Mobile Money Presence

References

Vodafone
Payment systems
Telecommunications companies of Kenya
Communications in Tanzania